Boris Anatolyevich Gavrilov (born 12 March 1952) is a Russian professional football coach and a former player.

Career
Born in Gavrilov-Yam, Gavrilov began playing professional footballer with local side FC Shinnik Yaroslavl. He spent his entire footballing career with Shinnik Yaroslavl, playing until age 38. After he retired, Gavrilov coached for Shinnik.

References

External links
 

1952 births
Living people
People from Yaroslavl Oblast
Soviet footballers
FC Shinnik Yaroslavl players
Russian football managers
FC Shinnik Yaroslavl managers
Russian Premier League managers
Association football forwards
Sportspeople from Yaroslavl Oblast
Association football midfielders